Atish Paray is a collection of short stories by Saadat Hasan Manto.

Background
Atish Paray subtitled “a collection of several thought-provoking stories” was published in 1936 while Manto was living in Amritsar. Two stories from this collection Tamasha - Manto's debut story followed by Taqat Ka Imtehan first appeared in a local weekly Khalq (Creation) by Abdul Bari Alig from Amritsar. The collection was however published from Lahore and Manto dedicated this collection to his late father.

Content
There are eight stories in this collection:

 Khooni Thook (Bloody Spit)
 Inqalab Pasand (Revolutionary)
 Ji Aaya Sahab (Coming Sir)
 Mahigir  (Fisherman)
 Tamasha (Spectacle)
 Taqat ka Imtehan (Test of Strength)
 Deewana Shayr (Mad Poet)
 Chori (Theft)

Notes

References

Cited sources

Indian short stories
Saadat Hasan Manto
Urdu-language books
1936 short story collections
Progressive Writers' Movement